
Gmina Włoszakowice is a rural gmina (administrative district) in Leszno County, Greater Poland Voivodeship, in west-central Poland.

The gmina contains part of the protected area called Przemęt Landscape Park.

Villages
Gmina Włoszakowice contains the villages and settlements of Adamowo, Berlinek, Boguszyn, Boszkowo, Boszkowo-Letnisko, Bukówiec Górny, Charbielin, Daćbogi, Dłużyna, Dominice, Grotniki, Janówko, Jezierzyce Kościelne, Kierzki, Koczury, Krzycko Wielkie, Krzyżowiec, Mścigniew, Papiernia, Piorunowo, Sądzia, Sądzia-Cegielnia, Skarżyń, Tłucznia, Trzebidza, Ujazdowo, Włoszakowice, Zbarzewo and Zbarzyk.

Neighbouring gminas
Gmina Włoszakowice is bordered by the gminas of Lipno, Przemęt, Śmigiel, Święciechowa, Wijewo and Wschowa.

References
Polish official population figures 2006

Wloszakowice
Leszno County